Luxembourg for Finance is an agency to promote and development Luxembourg's Financial Centre. The agency is a public-private partnership between the government of Luxembourg and the Luxembourg Financial Industry Federation, led by Nicolas Mackel, which brings together the various trade bodies of the Luxembourg financial sector, such as the Luxembourg Banker’s Association, the Association of the Luxembourg Fund Industry or the Association of Insurance and Reinsurance Companies in Luxembourg.

History
Founded in 2008, the objective of Luxembourg for Finance is to help develop and diversify Luxembourg’s financial services industry, position the financial centre abroad and identify new business opportunities. It connects international investors to the range of financial services provided in Luxembourg, such as investment funds, wealth management, capital market operations or advisory services.

Rankings
The Luxembourg Financial Centre is ranked as the leading financial centre in the Eurozone and 3rd in Europe after London and Zurich.

References

Finance in Luxembourg
Government agencies established in 2008